Dušan Grézl (born 4 May 1979) is a Paralympic athlete from the Czech Republic competing mainly in category F38 shot put events.

Dušan competed in all three throws in the 2004 Summer Paralympics at the F38 class, winning the bronze medal in the shot put.  The shot put was the only event he competed at in Beijing in 2008 finishing 9th in the combined F37/38 event.

References

 Čeští atleti zápasili se zdravím, Pistorius vyhrál druhé zlato at Czech Sports Association of Physically Handicapped

Paralympic athletes of the Czech Republic
Athletes (track and field) at the 2004 Summer Paralympics
Athletes (track and field) at the 2008 Summer Paralympics
Athletes (track and field) at the 2012 Summer Paralympics
Athletes (track and field) at the 2016 Summer Paralympics
Paralympic bronze medalists for the Czech Republic
Living people
1979 births
Medalists at the 2004 Summer Paralympics
Paralympic medalists in athletics (track and field)
Czech male shot putters